Workaholics is an American television sitcom that ran on Comedy Central from April 6, 2011 to March 15, 2017, with a total of 86 episodes spanning seven seasons. The series stars Blake Anderson, Adam DeVine, and Anders Holm of the comedy troupe Mail Order Comedy as three college dropouts, also roommates and friends, who work together at the telemarketing company TelAmeriCorp.

Series overview

Episodes

Season 1 (2011)

Season 2 (2011)

Season 3 (2012–13)

Season 4 (2014)

Season 5 (2015)

Season 6 (2016)

Season 7 (2017)

Ratings

References

External links
 
 

Lists of American sitcom episodes